Altagonum stellaris is a species of ground beetle in the subfamily Carabinae. It was described by Darlington in 1971.

References

stellaris
Beetles described in 1971